Joanna Kos-Krauze (born 8 December 1972), credited also as Joanna Kos, is a Polish film director and screenwriter, best known for her collaboration with her husband, Krzysztof Krauze (My Nikifor, Plac Zbawiciela /Saviour square).

In 2013 Joanna Kos and Krzysztof Krauze completed work on a biopic about the Romani poet, Papusza.

References

External links and sources
 
 Joanna Kos-Krauze at the Culture.pl

Polish film directors
Polish women film directors
Polish screenwriters
Polish women screenwriters
1972 births
Living people
People from Olsztyn